Cholinesterase reactivators are drugs that reverses the inhibition of cholinesterase by organophosphates or sulfonates. They are used as antidote for treating organophosphate insecticide and nerve agent poisoning.

See also
Acetylcholinesterase inhibitor
Nerve agent

References